River Garry may refer to:

River Garry, Inverness-shire
River Garry, Perthshire

See also
Garry River, New Zealand